Yung is a surname in various cultures.

Origins
Yung may be a spelling of a number of Chinese surnames based on their pronunciation in different varieties of Chinese, including the below surnames (listed by their spelling in Pinyin, which reflects the Mandarin pronunciation):

Róng, spelled Yung based on its Cantonese pronunciation
Róng, spelled Yung based on its pronunciations in multiple varieties of Chinese including Hakka
Wēng, spelled Yung based on its Cantonese pronunciation
Yáng

Yung is also a variant spelling of the English and Scottish surname Young. These surnames originated from the Middle English word .

Yung may also originate from Cyrillic transcription of the German surname Jung, which can be found among the descendants of Germans in the former Soviet Union.

Statistics
According to statistics cited by Patrick Hanks, there were 338 people on the island of Great Britain and twelve on the island of Ireland with the surname Yung as of 2011.  There had been twelve people with the surname Yung in Great Britain in 1881.

The 2010 United States Census found 4,218 people with the surname Yung, making it the 7,849th-most-common name in the country.  This represented a decrease from 4,272 (7,208th-most-common) in the 2000 census.  In both censuses, about three-quarters of the bearers of the surname identified as Asian, and two-tenths as White.

People

Yung Wing (1828–1912), first Chinese graduate of an American university
Nikolay Yung (1855–1905), Imperial Russian Navy officer
Yung Fung-shee (1900–1972), Hong Kong philanthropist
Victor Sen Yung (1915–1980), American character actor
Sanford Yung (1927–2013), Hong Kong accountant
Bill Yung (born 1934), American football coach
Larry Yung (born 1942), Chinese businessman
Judy Yung (born 1946), American sociologist
Richard Yung (born 1947), French politician
Sergey Yung (born 1955), Russian race walker
Barbara Yung (1959–1985), Hong Kong actress
Moti Yung (born 1959), cryptographer at Google
Yung Yim King (born 1959), Hong Kong fencer
Yvonne Yung (born 1968), Beijing-born Hong Kong actress
Frances Yung (born 1972), Chinese businesswoman
Eunice Yung (born 1977), Hong Kong barrister and politician
Joey Yung (born 1980), Hong Kong singer
Élodie Yung (born 1981), French actress
Yung Pi-hock, Taiwanese basketball player who represented the Republic of China at the 1956 Olympics
Terence Yung, Hong Kong-born American classical pianist
Yuk L. Yung, professor at the California Institute of Technology

People with a stage name that uses the surname Yung include:
Mike Yung, stage name of Michael Young (born 1959), American singer
Su Yung, ring name of Vannarah Riggs (born 1989), American professional wrestler
Yukio Yung, stage name of Terry Burrows, English musician

References

Chinese-language surnames
English-language surnames
Multiple Chinese surnames